Max Meadows is the third album by Pelt, released on March 24, 1997 through VHF Records.

Track listing

Personnel 
Pelt
Patrick Best – instruments
Mike Gangloff – vocals, instruments
Jack Rose – instruments
Production and additional personnel
James Connell – djembe on "Hippy War Machine"
Chris Davis – drums on "Hippy War Machine"
Vicki Ellison – photography
Fudd – recording on "Sunken" and "Abcdelancey (Gimme That Dickel)"
Sarah Johnson – photography
Beth Jones – djembe on "Hippy War Machine"
Mark Miley – drums on "Hippy War Machine"
Mike Pacello – djembe on "Hippy War Machine"
Amy Shea – auto harp on "Hippy War Machine", bowed cymbal on "Dismal Falls", photography

References 

1997 albums
Pelt (band) albums
VHF Records albums